The 2008–09 Croatian First Football League (officially known as the T-Com Prva HNL for sponsorship reasons) was the eighteenth season of the Croatian First Football League, the national championship for men's association football teams in Croatia, since its establishment in 1992. It started on 27 July 2008 and ended on 31 May 2009. Dinamo Zagreb were the defending champions, having won their twelfth championship title the previous season, and they defended the title again, after a win against Slaven Belupo on 17 May 2009.

Promotion and relegation 
Međimurje were automatically relegated to Druga HNL as they finished last in the previous season, while Croatia Sesvete were automatically promoted from Druga HNL after winning the 2007–08 title. In a two-legged playoff between Inter Zaprešić and Hrvatski dragovoljac, the former kept their Prva HNL status by beating Hrvatski dragovoljac with 2–0 on aggregate (2–0, 0–0).

League expansion 
In June 2007 Igor Štimac, president of Association of Prva HNL clubs, proposed a future expansion of Prva HNL from 12 to 16 clubs, starting from 2008–09 season. However, although a majority of club representatives supported that proposal, no strict agreement or final decision was made. On HNS meeting in late August 2007 it was decided to postpone the decision for late 2007 or even 2008 and that the expansion would not be possible before the 2009–10 season.

For more than a year nothing explicit was stated on that matter. Finally, on a regular HNS meeting in February 2009 HNS Secretary Zorislav Srebrić stated that club licensing would decide whether the 2009–10 season would feature 12 or 16 teams. Theoretically, if only 15 teams obtained Prva HNL license, league would have featured 12 teams. The deadline for submitting the license was 1 May 2009. On 8 May 2009 HNS declared that all 19 clubs that applied for the license were awarded with it and would be in possibility to enter the league in 2009–10, now expanded to 16 clubs. Also, on 26 May 2009 HNS received official confirmations from all 19 clubs in which they expressed their will to compete in next year's Prva HNL, what means that none of the clubs would withdraw from the league. However, despite their guarantee to compete in Prva HNL, Slavonac eventually withdrew although they finished fourth and earned direct access to 2009–10 Prva HNL. Their place was taken by Međimurje while sixth-placed Hrvatski Dragovoljac competed in a relegation play-offs.

Stadiums and locations 
After the death of Hrvoje Ćustić during a game played at Zadar's Stanovi Stadium in March 2008, it was decided that the stadia for the 2008–09 season would have to pass a closer inspection to be deemed fit for first-league football. Since only 9 stadia managed to meet the requirements and obtain first-league license from the Croatian Football Federation, it was announced in May 2008 that some of the teams (Cibalia, Croatia Sesvete, Zadar and NK Zagreb) would have to share stadia and temporarily play their home games at other venues. Just before Round 1 kicked off, Cibalia managed to bring their stadium to standard, and in August, just before round 5, Zadar secured the licence to play their games at Stanovi Stadium.

Stadia and personnel 

 1 On final match day of the season, played on 31 May 2009.

Managerial changes

League table

Relegation play-off 
Due to the expansion of Prva HNL to 16 clubs in the 2009–10 season, four clubs from 2008–09 Druga HNL were automatically promoted. Those should have been top four clubs, but since Slavonac withdrew their direct access spot was taken by fifth-placed Međimurje. Therefore, the 12th placed Croatia Sesvete played a two-legged relegation play-off against the 6th placed team of Druga HNL, Hrvatski Dragovoljac. Croatia Sesvete won 2–1 on aggregate and thereby earned a spot in the 2009–10 season.

Results 
The schedule consisted of three rounds. During the first two rounds, each team played each other once home and away for a total of 22 matches. The pairings of the third round were then set according to the standings after the first two rounds, giving every team a third game against each opponent for a total of 33 games per team.

First and second round

Third round

Top goalscorers 
Source: HRnogomet.com

Transfers 
 List of Croatian football transfers winter 2008–09

See also 
 2008–09 Croatian Football Cup
 2008–09 Croatian Second Football League

References

External links 
 Season statistics at HRNogomet
 2008–09 in Croatian Football at Rec.Sport.Soccer Statistics Foundation
 Official website 

2008-09
Cro
2008–09 in Croatian football